STS Media may refer to:

 STS (TV channel), a Russian TV network
 CTC Media, a Russian independent broadcasting company
 STS Media, Inc., a Los Angeles-based company headed by Stephen Stokols